Jean-Christophe Nabi (born 4 November 1973) is an Ivorian former professional tennis player.

Nabi, a native of Abidjan, was discovered as an 11-year old by Georges Goven. He was a member of the Ivory Coast Davis Cup team from 1989 to 2003 and featured in a total of 11 ties, all in Africa Zone Group II. One of his biggest achievements was winning the singles gold medal at the 1991 All-Africa Games in Cairo, beating countryman Claude N'Goran in the final. He played at club level in France for Toulouse, Bordeaux, Roye and Lamorlaye.

References

External links
 
 
 

1973 births
Living people
Ivorian male tennis players
Sportspeople from Abidjan
African Games gold medalists for Ivory Coast
African Games medalists in tennis
Competitors at the 1991 All-Africa Games
Ivorian expatriate sportspeople in France